was a designer of ukiyo-e woodblock prints in Osaka who was active during the late Edo period. He was a leading producer of kamigata-e, prints from the Osaka and Kyoto areas. He is also known as Sadamasu [貞升], the artist name he used prior to Kunimasu.

Biography
Very little is known of Kunimasa's personal details, including his birth and death dates. Art historians tend to date his activity to the early 1830s through the early 1850s. An 1835 'Who's who' type catalogue from the Naniwa area of Osaka describes him as "a master" of ukiyo-e, indicating that he was already a well-established artist by the early 1830s. Other manuscripts from the mid 1840s list him as living in the Senba [船場] district of Osaka. In 1899, a brief biography by Meiji era historian Sekine Shisei (1868–1912) was included in a compendium of biographies. According to Sekine, Kunimasu was a moneyed property owner who studied print design under Utagawa Kunisada in Edo before himself mentoring several pupils and opening his own print design school. Others have suggested that the artist was born into wealth and owned a shipbuilding company. What is certain is that he enjoyed considerable financial freedom and used it to promote ukiyo-e and its producers within Osaka.

Names

As per convention, the artist was known by a number of names throughout his career:  
 Artist names: Sadamasu [貞升] (1832–1848), Kunimasu [國升 (occasionally 國益)] (5/1848- )
 Personal name: Kaneya/ Kanaya Wasaburō [金屋  和三郎]
 Studio Name: Kanaya/ Kaneya [金屋]
 Gō: Gochōsai [五蝶斎], Gochōtei [五蝶亭], Gofukutei [五蝠亭], Ichiensai [一園斎], Ichijuen [一樹園], Ichijusai [一樹斎], Ichijutei [一樹亭], Yukimasu [行升] 
 Art surname: Utagawa [歌川]
 Seals: Hatakumi, Sada, Sadamasu, Utagawa, Utagawa Kunimasu, Wasa  
In 1846 or earlier, he began signing prints as Kunimasu in homage to Kunisada who had taken the name Toyokuni in 1844. The name change could not, however, be made official until 1848 and the lifting of the Tenpō Reforms.

Seals
In addition to the name seals listed above, Kunimasu used three symbol seals: a bat-shaped seal, the symbol 寿 [ju - longevity], and the toshidama-in cartouche. The latter distinctive mark was reserved for members of the Utagawa school of print designers. Examples of other seals applied to Kunimasu's prints exist, but are indecipherable.

Work
Kunimasu's earliest known print is a banzuke theatre playbill dating to early 1830. Signed "eshi Utagawa Sadamasu ga" [絵師　歌川　貞升　画], the print was almost certainly produced while he was in Edo studying under Utagawa Kunisada. Kunimasu has been described as an "influential" figure on the Osaka art scene, one of his greatest achievements being the popularization of the chūban format. Kunimasu began experimenting with close-up actor portraits in this size in 1840, not long before the Tenpō Reforms were to disrupt yakusha-e production. He encouraged his student and fellow pupil of Kunisada, Hirosada, to follow suit. With the repeal of the Tenpō Reforms in the spring of 1847, Hirosada was to pioneer a revival of the chūban portrait format, likely through the financial support of Kunimasu.

Critics tend to admire Kunimasu's "sense of colour and... fine palette dominated by intense colours with subtle contrasts," as well as the "bold directness" of his lines. In addition, he is credited with employing "tour-de-force techniques" such as "sumptuously printed... metallic pigments, embossing, burnishing, [and] overprinting."

The majority of Kunimasu's works belong to the yakusha-e genre, being portraits of actors from the local kabuki theatre world. This is a common feature of artists from the Kamigata region, where the vast majority of artists were not professionals, but "talented kabuki fans." Kunimasu in particular is credited with "expressing the psychology of stage performance through powerful and varied physiognomies and vivid or unusual placements of the figures in his compositions."

In 1852, Kunimasu and his student Hirosada visited Edo, where they joined with other pupils of Kunisada in creating background designs for a series of half-length actor portraits. Soon after returning to Kamigata, Kunimasu turned his back on ukiyo-e and took up painting. He ended his artistic career producing paintings in the style of the Shijō school, known for its blending of Japanese tradition with Western realism.

Students
Kunimasu is well known to have been an active proponent of Osaka printmaking and to have directly aided the careers of a number of artists. Among those known to have studied under Kunimasu are the following:
 Nobukatsu [信勝] (fl. late 1820s-late 1830s)
 Sadayuki [貞雪] (fl. 1839-1840)
 Utagawa Hirosada [歌川  廣貞] (fl. 1835-1850s)
 Masuharu [升春] (fl. 1849-1850)
 Masunobu [升信] (fl. 1847-1851)
 Masusada [升貞] (fl. 1848-1849)
 Sadamasu II [貞升] (fl. 1849)
 Hasegawa Sadanobu [長谷川  貞信] (fl. 1834-1879)

Collections
Works signed by Sadamasu or Kunimasu belong to the following museum collections:
 The Museum of Fine Arts, Boston
 The Royal Ontario Museum
 The Rijksmuseum
 The Pushkin Museum
 The National Gallery of Victoria
 The Fitzwilliam Museum
 The British Museum
 The Fine Arts Museums of San Francisco
 The Metropolitan Museum of Art

Notes

See also
 Bust portrait of Actor Kataoka Ichizō I (Gochōtei Sadamasu II)

References
 Barry Rosensteel Japanese Print Collection. "歌川貞升 [Utagawa Sadamasu] fl. 1832-1854." Accessed November 29, 2013. http://orlabs.oclc.org/identities/lccn-no2010-147721
 Clark, Timothy. "Ready for a Close-up: Actor 'Likenesses' in Edo and Osaka." In Kabuki Heroes on the Osaka Stage 1780-1830, edited by C. Andrew Gerstle. London: British Museum Press, 2005.
 Doesburg, Jan van. "Sadamasu." Huys den Esch Gallery. 2012. Accessed November 29, 2013. http://www.huysdenesch.com/ENG/sadamasu/sadumasu-career
 Fiorillo, John. "Utagawa Kunimasu." Viewing Japanese Prints. Accessed November 29, 2013. https://web.archive.org/web/20140720124018/http://viewingjapaneseprints.net/texts/ukiyoetexts/ukiyoe_pages/kunimasu4.html
 Keyes, Roger S. & Keiko Mizushima. The Theatrical World of Osaka Prints, Philadelphia: Philadelphia Museum of Art, 1973.
 Kitagawa, Hiroko. "Kamigata-e: The Prints of Osaka and Kyoto." In The Hotei Encyclopedia of Japanese Wood Block Prints, vol 1. Edited by Amy Reigle Newland, 229-232. Hotei Publishing: Amsterdam, 2005.
 Lane, Richard. Images from the Floating World, The Japanese Print. Oxford: Oxford University Press, 1978. ;  OCLC 5246796
 Lyon Collection. "Utagawa Sadamasu." Accessed November 29, 2013. http://woodblockprints.org/index.php/Detail/Entity/Show/entity_id/79
 Museum of Fine Arts Boston. "Actor Kataoka Ichizô I as Tetsugadake Dazaemon." Accessed November 29, 2013. http://educators.mfa.org/actor-kataoka-ichiz%C3%B4-i-tetsugadake-dazaemon-148444
 Newland, Amy Reigle, ed. Hotei Encyclopedia of Japanese Woodblock Prints.  Amsterdam: Hotei, 2005. ;  OCLC 61666175 
 Online Computer Library Center. "歌川貞升 fl. 1832-1854 [Utagawa Sadamasu f. 1832-1854]." OCLC World Cat Identities. Accessed December 1, 2013. http://orlabs.oclc.org/identities/lccn-no2010-147721
 The Pushkin State Museum of Fine Arts. "Utagawa Kunimasu." 2013. Accessed November 29, 2013. http://www.japaneseprints.ru/data/authors/453_KUNIMASU_Utagava/index.php?lang=en
 Roberts, Laurance P. A Dictionary of Japanese Artists: Painting, Sculpture, Ceramics, Prints, Lacquer. Weatherhill: New York, 1990.

External links
 http://www.japaneseprints.ru/data/authors/453_KUNIMASU_Utagava/index.php?lang=en - images of Kunimasu prints in the Pushkin
 http://www.ngv.vic.gov.au/col/artist/3584 - images of Kunimasu prints in National Gallery of Victoria collection
 http://amica.davidrumsey.com/luna/servlet/view/all/who/Sadamasu/what/Prints?sort=OCS - images of prints in Fine Arts Museums of San Francisco
 https://www.britishmuseum.org/research/collection_online/collection_object_details.aspx?objectId=3072591&partId=1&people=146300&peoA=146300-2-59&page=1 - image of print in British Museum collection

19th-century Japanese people
Ukiyo-e artists
Kunimasu